The following lists events that happened during 2012 in the Maldives.

Incumbents
President: Mohamed Nasheed (until 7 February), Mohammed Waheed Hassan (starting 7 February)
Vice President: Mohammed Waheed Hassan (until 7 February), Mohammed Waheed Deen (starting 25 April)

Events

February
 February 7 - President Mohamed Nasheed resigns on national television as the unrest spreads with the mutinying officers gaining control of state television. The former Vice President of the Maldives Mohammed Waheed Hassan is sworn in vowing to uphold the "rule of law".
 February 8 - The new President of the Maldives Mohammed Waheed Hassan calls for the formation of a national unity government while supporters of former President Mohamed Nasheed riot.
 February 10 - Mohamed Nasheed demands new elections and threatens protests if the new government meet the demands.

August
 August 30 - A Commonwealth-backed inquiry dismisses claims that a military coup forced Mohamed Nasheed from power.

October
 October 1 - Mohamed Nasheed fails to appear in court and departs on tour for his party. Vice-president Mohammed Waheed Deen, opening an academic conference in Malé, says a nation can achieve democracy by the teachers imparting the relevant information.
 October 2 - A member of the People’s Majlis, the parliament of the Maldives, is found stabbed to death near his home.

References

 
2010s in the Maldives
Years of the 21st century in the Maldives
Maldives
Maldives